Óscar Vásquez (born 15 November 1986) is a Chilean rower. He competed at the 2004 Summer Olympics, 2008 Summer Olympics and the 2012 Summer Olympics.

References

External links
 

1986 births
Living people
Chilean male rowers
Olympic rowers of Chile
Rowers at the 2004 Summer Olympics
Rowers at the 2008 Summer Olympics
Rowers at the 2012 Summer Olympics
People from Valdivia
Pan American Games medalists in rowing
Pan American Games gold medalists for Chile
Pan American Games silver medalists for Chile
Rowers at the 2015 Pan American Games
Rowers at the 2019 Pan American Games
Medalists at the 2019 Pan American Games
Medalists at the 2015 Pan American Games
21st-century Chilean people